Frank Joseph Pearl González (born 1962) is a Colombian economist. He served as the 1st Minister of Environment and Sustainable Development serving in the administration of President Juan Manuel Santos Calderón, and as the 1st High Presidential Advisor for the Social and Economic Reintegration of People and Groups Up in Arms during the administration of President Álvaro Uribe Vélez between 2006 and 2010 during which time he was also entrusted the office of High Commissioner for Peace ad interim in replacement of Luis Carlos Restrepo Ramírez, until his resignation from both posts in 2010.

On 19 September 2011, President Juan Manuel Santos Calderón designated Pearl to head the process that divided the Ministry of Environment, Housing, and Territorial Development into two separate portfolios of environment and housing, and afterwards was entrusted the just created Ministry of Environment and Sustainable Development.

Personal life
He was born in 1962 in Bogotá, D.C. to a Canadian father, John (Jackie) Pearl, and a Colombian mother, María Francisca González Gaitán.

See also
 Sandra Bessudo Lion

References

1962 births
Living people
Colombian people of Canadian descent
People from Bogotá
University of Los Andes (Colombia) alumni
University of Western Ontario alumni
Colombian economists
Presidential advisers of Colombia
Peace Commissioners of Colombia
Ministers of Environment and Sustainable Development of Colombia